Marvin Josephson (March 6, 1927 – May 17, 2022) was an American executive. He was the founder of ICM Partners.

Josephson graduated from Cornell University in 1949, where he was managing editor of The Cornell Daily Sun and a member of the Quill and Dagger society.

References

1927 births
2022 deaths
American business executives
Cornell University alumni